This article aims at showing the evolution of the Angola women's national basketball team throughout the 1980s, 1990s and 2000s in such competitions as the FIBA Africa Championship, the Olympic Games and the FIBA World Championship.

2011–2017

Angola women's basketball players 2011–2017A = African championship; = African championship winner;W = World cup

2003–2009
Angola women's basketball players 2001–2010AC = African championship;WC = World cup

1990–1997
Angola women's basketball players 1990–1997AC = African championship;OQ = Olympic qualifier

1981–1988
Angola women's basketball players 1981–1988A = African championship;O = Olympic qualifier

See also
 List of Angola women's national handball team players
 Angola national basketball team U18
 Angola national basketball team U16
 Angola Women's Basketball League
 Federação Angolana de Basquetebol
 List of Angola international footballers

References

Angola women's national basketball team